The India International Arbitration Centre erstwhile known as the 'New Delhi International Arbitration Centre' (NDIAC) is an autonomous institution based in New Delhi, to conduct arbitration, mediation, and conciliation proceedings. It was established in 2019 and declared as an Institute of National Importance by an Act of Parliament.

References

External links
 Official Act

Arbitration organizations
2019 establishments in Delhi
Law of India